Ibrahim Al-Hamaidi (born 28 August 1985) is a Saudi Arabian hurdler. He competed in the men's 400 metres hurdles at the 2004 Summer Olympics.

References

1985 births
Living people
Athletes (track and field) at the 2004 Summer Olympics
Saudi Arabian male hurdlers
Olympic athletes of Saudi Arabia
Place of birth missing (living people)
Athletes (track and field) at the 2002 Asian Games
Asian Games competitors for Saudi Arabia
Islamic Solidarity Games competitors for Saudi Arabia
21st-century Saudi Arabian people